The Woman's Club of Lincoln is a historic women's club.  Its clubhouse, at 499 E St. in Lincoln, California, was listed on the National Register of Historic Places in 2001.

The club began as a Woman's Improvement Club in 1911 "for the purpose of serving the community and enriching the lives of its members. This women's group eventually became the Woman's Club of Lincoln, a club historically significant for its involvement in the welfare of the citizens of the community and its interest in the betterment and beautification of the City of Lincoln."  It organized more formally, by adopting by-laws, in 1922 and had its building constructed during 1923–24.  The clubhouse is a one-story stuccoed wood-frame  building with a red clay tile roof.

References

Women's club buildings in California
National Register of Historic Places in Placer County, California
Mission Revival architecture in California
History of women in California